File System Navigator (fsn; pronounced "fusion") is an experimental application to view a file system in 3D, made by SGI for IRIX systems.

Even though it was never developed to a fully functional file manager, it gained some fame after appearing in the movie Jurassic Park in 1993. In a scene in the film, the character Lex Murphy, played by Ariana Richards, finds a computer displaying the interface.  She exclaims, "It's a UNIX system! I know this!" and proceeds to restart the building's access control system, locking the control room's doors. After the release of the film, some perceived the visualization as an example of media misrepresentation of computers, citing the computer game-like display as being an unrealistic Hollywood mockup while unaware of the program's legitimate existence.

See also 

 File System Visualizer, a free clone of FSN for various Unix-like operating systems
 GopherVR, a 3D visualisation tool for the Gopher hypertext protocol

References

External links 
 
 fsv fsn clone for Linux and other Unix-like operating systems.

Unix file system-related software
3D file managers
IRIX software